Lipoamide acyltransferase component of branched-chain alpha-keto acid dehydrogenase complex, mitochondrial is an enzyme that in humans is encoded by the DBT gene.

The branched-chain alpha-keto acid dehydrogenase complex (BCKD) is an inner-mitochondrial enzyme complex involved in the breakdown of the branched-chain amino acids isoleucine, leucine, and valine. The BCKD complex is thought to be composed of a core of 24 transacylase (E2) subunits, and associated decarboxylase (E1), dehydrogenase (E3), and regulatory subunits. This gene encodes the transacylase (E2) subunit. Mutations in this gene result in maple syrup urine disease, type 2. Alternatively spliced transcript variants have been described, but their biological validity has not been determined.

References

Further reading

Mitochondrial proteins